The 1975 New Democratic Party leadership election, was held in Winnipeg, from July 4 to 7  to elect a leader of the New Democratic Party of Canada.  David Lewis retired as federal leader, and Ed Broadbent was elected as his successor.  Rosemary Brown made the first attempt by woman-of-colour to run for leader of a major recognized Canadian political party and came in second. Broadbent led the NDP to its greatest electoral successes to then, including the historic 43 seats in the House of Commons in 1988.  This convention marked the beginning of fourteen years of party unity and stability that allowed it to reach its best electoral performances of the 20th century.

References
 
 

New Democratic Party
1975
July 1975 events in Canada
New Democratic Party leadership election